Ada Tolla is an Italian-born architect and co-founder (with Giuseppe Lignano) of the architectural design studio LOT-EK. LOT-EK has achieved high visibility for their sustainable and innovative approach to construction, materials, and space and through the adaptive reuse ("upcycling") of existing industrial objects and systems not originally intended for architecture.

Tolla has a degree in architecture and urban design from the Universita' di Napoli, Italy, and completed postgraduate studies at Columbia University, in New York City. Besides heading her professional practice at LOT-EK, she currently teaches at Columbia University's Graduate School of Architecture, Planning and Preservation. She also lectures at other universities and cultural institutions globally.

In December 2011, Tolla was recognized as a United States Artists (USA) Booth Fellow of Architecture and Design. Nominations are made each year by arts leaders and practitioners, critics, and scholars, of artists they believe show an extraordinary commitment to their craft.

LOT-EK has completed numerous residential, commercial and institutional projects in the US and abroad, as well as exhibition design and site-specific installations for major cultural institutions and museums, including the Museum of Modern Art, the Whitney Museum the Guggenheim and MAXXI. Its projects are regularly published in international publications, magazines and books, such as The New York Times, The London Times, Herald Tribune, The Wall Street Journal, Domus, A+U, Mark Magazine, Wired, Dwell, Metropolis, Vogue, and others.

LOT-EK, Objects and Operations, the studio's new monograph, was released by The Monacelli Press in August 2017. Its first monograph, Urbanscan, was published by PAP in February 2002. LOT-EK Mixer, by Edizioni Press, was issued in 2000, and MDU Mobile Dwelling Unit, published by DAP, was printed in June 2003.

References

External links
LOT-EK

1964 births
Living people
21st-century Italian architects
University of Naples Federico II alumni